Turki Marwan Saad Al-Ammar (born 23 September 1999) is a Saudi Arabian football player who plays as a midfielder for Al-Shabab in Saudi Professional League.

Widely regarded for his skillful display and good vision, Al-Ammar is praised to be one of the next top best Saudi football talents.

Career

Club career
He made his debut for Al-Shabab in 2017, having played for several youth level of the club. Though only managed to appear in 20 games, he left impression for his strong and energetic display, for which he helped Al-Shabab to achieve fifth place in the 2018–19 Saudi Professional League season. This allowed him to receive the award as the best young player of the Saudi Professional League in 2018.

International career

U-20 Saudi Arabia
He was named on the final list of the Saudi Arabia U19 participating in the 2018 AFC U-19 Championship held in Indonesia. This tournament saw Turki Al-Ammar managed an outstanding performance, scoring four goals for the Saudi side as his skillful display put up an instrumental part of Saudi Arabia's conquest of the tournament. For this reason, he was named as the best player of the competition, and was later included as young player of the year by the Asian Football Confederation, the first Saudi to ever achieve this honor.

However, despite skillful performance of Al-Ammar in the 2018 U-19 Asian Cup, his performance in the 2019 FIFA U-20 World Cup held in Poland was a complete disappointment, with he silenced himself in many important moments as Saudi Arabia, the champions of Asia, exited from the group stage in a complete humiliation with three straight defeats, the first time since 1985.

Senior team
His impressive performance at the 2018 U-19 Asian Cup allowed him to occupy a spot in the Saudi squad, as he was first called up to the main team by then-manager Juan Antonio Pizzi for the friendlies against Yemen, Jordan and South Korea. He was unused for the match against Yemen and Jordan. He was later omitted from the squad for the 2019 AFC Asian Cup.

Turki Al-Ammar finally made his debut for the senior team in the friendly against Paraguay at home, came on as substitute for Yahya Al-Shehri at the second half, where they drew goalless. He was also included to the final squad of the 24th Arabian Gulf Cup under coach Hervé Renard, but after the disastrous 1–3 loss to Kuwait, he is not used. Saudi Arabia eventually recovered with Turki Al-Ammar being unused to march to the final.

Career statistics

Club

International

International goals
Scores and results list Saudi Arabia's goal tally first.

Honours

International
Saudi Arabia U20
 AFC U-19 Championship: 2018
Saudi Arabia U23
AFC U-23 Asian Cup: 2022

Individual 

Asian Young Footballer of the Year: 2018
Saudi Pro League Young Player of the Year: 2018

References

1999 births
Living people
Saudi Arabian footballers
Saudi Arabia youth international footballers
Saudi Arabia international footballers
Association football midfielders
Saudi Professional League players
Al-Shabab FC (Riyadh) players
Asian Young Footballer of the Year winners